Ferdinand von Miller (18 October 1813 – 11 February 1887) was a German artisan who is noted for his furtherance of bronze founding.

Biography

Von Miller was born in Fürstenfeldbruck.

After a sojourn at the academy in Munich and a preliminary engagement at the royal brass foundry, Miller traveled to Paris in 1833, where he learnt from Soyer and Blus the varied technique necessary for bronze working. He also visited England and the Netherlands, and after his return to Munich worked under his teacher and uncle Stiglmayr, whom the Crown Prince Ludwig had induced to devote himself to bronze foundry work and to the establishment of the Munich foundry as a state institution. Miller soon took his uncle's place, and upon the death of the latter was appointed inspector of the workshop. He soon won for it a worldwide reputation, and for himself a fortune and position of influence.

The casting of the Bavaria statue (1844–55) especially brought him fame. Commissions came to him from far and near. He cast the statue of Herder, and the double statue of Goethe and Schiller, for Weimar, and also the figures of Duke Eberhard in Stuttgart, of Berzelius in Stockholm and two Washington monuments, by Mills in Boston and Crawford  in Richmond, Virginia. He also cast the gate of the Capitol in Washington. In 1874 Miller was elected to the directorate of the society of art industries. The Munich exhibition of art and crafts in 1876 was reportedly largely Miller's work. He sought to win over artists to a general exhibition of German art in alliance with handicrafts. Drawing rooms, cabinets, boudoirs, sitting rooms and chapels were arranged so as to form in their grouping a whole by having art and trade appliances put into the place for which they were intended. Where this was not possible, a partition or a wall would be placed with picturesque effect in some adjoining room. Miller established a center of exhibition and sale for the society, and procured himself a home especially for the social intercourse of artists and art craftsmen.

In 1840 he married Anna Pösl (1815–1890), daughter of the Chancellor of the regional government of Landshut, who bore him 14 children, including Ferdinand Freiherr von Miller, Oskar von Miller and Fritz von Miller.  He died in Munich, and was buried in the Alter Südfriedhof in the same city.

Image gallery

Ferdinand von Miller (the younger) and Oskar von Miller
Ferdinand von Miller's son Ferdinand (1842–1929) followed in his father's footsteps and is known in the United States for some of the figures on the Tyler Davidson Fountain in Cincinnati (at the unveiling on October 6, 1871, at which he was honored). He also created the statues of Shakespeare, Columbus and Alexander von Humboldt in Tower Grove Park of St. Louis  and of J. Marion Sims in New York. Another son of Ferdinand von Miller was Oskar von Miller, who became an engineer and founder of the Deutsches Museum, Munich.

Sources

 cites:
Pecht, Geschichte der Münchener Kunst (Munich, 1888);
Müller, Universal-Handbuch von München;

1813 births
1887 deaths
Bavarian nobility
People from Fürstenfeldbruck (district)
People from the Kingdom of Bavaria
German Roman Catholics
Members of the Bavarian Chamber of Deputies
Members of the 2nd Reichstag of the German Empire
Members of the 3rd Reichstag of the German Empire
Members of the 4th Reichstag of the German Empire
German metallurgists
German untitled nobility
Bronzeware
Foundries in Germany
Burials at the Alter Südfriedhof
Engineers from Bavaria
Von Miller family